Ori Biton (born 2 October 1987) is an Israeli professional footballer who plays for Maccabi Tel Aviv.

Honours 
Maccabi Tel Aviv
 Israeli Noar Leumit League: 2004–05

References

1987 births
Living people
Israeli Jews
Israeli footballers
Association football midfielders
Maccabi Tel Aviv F.C. players
Hapoel Ra'anana A.F.C. players
Hapoel Marmorek F.C. players
Maccabiah Games medalists in football
Maccabiah Games gold medalists for Israel
Israeli people of Moroccan-Jewish descent
Israeli Premier League players
Liga Leumit players